The Denison Community School District is a rural public school district based in Denison, Iowa.  The district is mainly in Crawford County, with a small area in Ida County.  The district serves the towns of Denison, Buck Grove, Deloit, and Kiron, and the surrounding rural areas. The school's mascot is the Monarchs. Their colors are purple and gold.

History
Since 1994, through a sharing agreement with Schleswig Community School District, students from Schleswig attend high school in Denison, and compete as Denison-Schleswig.
Mike Pardun has been the superintendent since 2003.

Schools
The district operates five schools, all in Denison:
Broadway Elementary School
Denison Elementary School
Denison Middle School
Denison High School
Denison Alternative High School

Denison High School

Athletics
The Monarchs compete in the Hawkeye 10 Conference in the following sports:

Fall sports
Football
Cross country (boys and girls)
Volleyball

Winter sports
Basketball (boys and girls)
 Boys' -1978 Class 2A State Champions
Bowling
Wrestling

Spring sports
Golf (boys and girls)
Soccer (boys and girls)
Tennis (boys and girls)
 Boys' - 1987 Class 1A State Champions</ref>
Track and field (boys and girls)

Summer sports
Baseball
 1994 Class 3A State Champions</ref>
Softball

See also
List of school districts in Iowa
List of high schools in Iowa

References

External links
 

Education in Crawford County, Iowa
Education in Ida County, Iowa
School districts in Iowa
School districts established in 1856
1856 establishments in Iowa